Charlie Smith (June 20, 1956 — 8 November 2005) was Romnichal poet who had a booklet of his poems published in the 1980s, which included the acclaimed "Space Gypsies" poem.

He was from a family of tailors, his schooling was not good and he left early, thinking himself semi-illiterate.

He is a member of the International Romani Writers' Association, IRWA (Kansainvälinen Romanikirjailijaliitto)

Politics
He was a member of the Labour party in Britain and was a sitting councillor, and a commissioner on the Commission for Racial Equality.

Books and films
The Spirit of the Flame (1990) - Book
Not all Waggons and Lanes (1995) - Book
Footsteps in the Sand (2004) - Film

External links

1956 births
2005 deaths
English Romani people
Romani poets
Romanichal
Romani politicians
Mayors of places in Essex
English male poets
20th-century English poets
20th-century English male writers